Gavali may refer to:

Gavali (caste), an Indian social group
Havalı, a place in Azerbaijan
Gavali, Karnataka a place in Belgaum district, Karnataka, India
Gavali, Udupi, a village in Udupi dist. Karnataka, India
Gavali, Iran, a village in Zanjan Province, Iran